Human Driftwood is a 1916 American silent drama film directed by Émile Chautard and starring Robert Warwick. It was produced by the Shubert Organization and released through World Film Company.

Cast
Robert Warwick as Robert Hendricks
Frances Nelson as Velma
Leonore Harris as Myra
Alec B. Francis as Father Harrigan
Al Hart as Lief Bergson

Preservation
With no prints of Human Driftwood located in any film archives, it is a lost film.

References

External links

1916 films
Lost American films
Films directed by Emile Chautard
American silent feature films
American black-and-white films
Silent American drama films
1916 drama films
World Film Company films
1916 lost films
Lost drama films
1910s American films